The Jalan Ampang Muslim Cemetery (Jawi: تانه ڤرقبورن اسلام جالن امڤاڠ) is a cemetery at the Kuala Lumpur city centre, Malaysia. It is located at Jalan Ampang near Kuala Lumpur City Centre. The cemetery was established on 1819.

Notable burials 

 Tan Sri Datuk Amar P. Ramlee – film actor, director, singer, and songwriter. (died 1973)
 Tan Sri Zainal Abidin Ahmad (Za'aba) – Malaysian writer and linguist. (died 1973)
 Puan Sri Datin Amar Salmah Ismail (Saloma) – Singapore-born Malaysian film actress, singer and also wife of Tan Sri P. Ramlee. (died 1983)
 Tan Sri Abdul Rahman Hashim – Inspector General of Police (died 1974, in an assassination carried out by communist subversives during the Communist insurgency in Malaysia (1968–89))
 Tun Abdul Malek Yusuf – Second Malacca state Yang di-Pertua Negeri (Governor) (1959–71) (died 1977)
 Tan Sri Dato' (Dr.) Haji Mubin Sheppard – Former Director-General of the National Archives of Malaysia, renowned historian and academician. (died 1994)  
 Tun Ismail Mohd Ali – Second Governor of Bank Negara Malaysia (died 1998)
 Nasir P. Ramlee – son of late P. Ramlee (died 2008)
 Tan Sri Ainuddin Wahid – educationist and Universiti Teknologi Malaysia (UTM) Vice Chancellor (died 2013)
 Tan Sri Dr Salma Ismail – first Malay woman doctor (died 2014)
 Mustapha Maarof – veteran actor (died 2014)
 Mariani Ismail – veteran actress and also sister of late actress Salmah Ismail (Saloma) (died 2015)
 Tan Sri S.M. Salim – veteran singer (died 2016)
 Tan Sri Elyas Omar – third Mayor of Kuala Lumpur (died 2018)

References

External links
 

Cemeteries in Kuala Lumpur
Muslim cemeteries